George Skakel (July 16, 1892 – October 3, 1955) was an American businessman and the founder of Great Lakes Carbon Corporation, part of SGL Carbon. He was the father-in-law of Robert F. Kennedy

Early life and career
Skakel was born in Chicago, Illinois, to businessman James Curtis Skakel and Grace Mary Jordan, who were Protestants of Dutch ancestry. He had an elder brother William Skakel, a younger sister Margaret Skakel, and a younger brother James Curtis Skakel Jr.

Skakel began his career as a railroad shipping clerk earning $8 a week. While employed by the railroad, he noticed the price volatility of coal fines for coke, which is a byproduct of producing more-in-demand forms of coal. At most times, the coal mining companies were forced to store the coke or pay to have it disposed of in rivers. Skakel came up with an idea to purchase the coke from coal companies. In May 1919, Skakel and two partners put up $1,000 and established The Great Lakes Coal & Coke Company. The company would purchase the coke from coal companies and reprocess it into clean carbon which was used to produce aluminum. By 1929, Skakel had become a multi-millionaire. The business eventually grew into The Great Lakes Carbon Corporation, which became one of the largest privately held corporations in the United States. After Skakel's death in 1955, his sons George Jr. (who also died in a plane crash, in 1966) and James III took over the business.

Personal life
Skakel married his former secretary Ann Brannack (1892–1955) on November 25, 1917. They had seven children:
Georgeann Skakel Dowdle-Terrien (1918–1983)
James Curtis Skakel III (1921–1998)
George Skakel Jr. (1922–1966)
Rushton Walter Skakel (1923–2003), father of Thomas and Michael Skakel.
Patricia Sistine Skakel Cuffe (1925–2000) mother to Ciarán Cuffe of the Green Party.
Ethel Skakel Kennedy (born 1928) married Robert F. Kennedy in June 1950.
Ann Skakel McCooey (born 1933).

Death

On October 3, 1955, George and Ann Skakel were killed when the private plane they were traveling in crashed near Union City, Oklahoma. They are buried at Saint Mary's Cemetery in Greenwich, Connecticut.

References

Further reading
 Rancho Palos Verdes – Ginger Garnett Clark – Google Books
 Fight of the Century – Timothy Dumas – Google Books
 Murder in Greenwich - Mark Fuhrman, Stephen Weeks - Google Books
 Robert Kennedy and His Times - Arthur M. Schlesinger, Jr. - Google Books

1892 births
1955 deaths
20th-century American businesspeople
Accidental deaths in Oklahoma
American people of Dutch descent
Burials in Connecticut
Businesspeople from Chicago
Victims of aviation accidents or incidents in the United States